The 2023 Nigeria Professional Football League is the 52nd season of Nigeria's top-flight association football league and the 33rd since attaining professionalism. The regular season started on 8 January 2023 and will conclude on 14 May 2023.

Format 
The clubs and league organizers decided to start the 2022-23 season on 8 January 2023 instead of 28 December 2022 as previously planned. The league will switch to an abridged format that will see the clubs split into two groups of ten each. The top three clubs from each group will qualify for a championship round, which will be known as the Super Six, to determine the league winners.

Teams

Changes from previous season 
The following teams changed divisions since the end of the 2021-22 season

Promoted from the 2021–22 Nigeria National League

 Bayelsa United
 Bendel Insurance
 Doma United
 El-Kanemi Warriors

Relegated from the 2021–22 Nigeria Professional Football League

 Heartland
 Kano Pillars
 Katsina United
 MFM

Regular season

Group A

League table

Positions by round

Results

Results by matches played

Group B

League table

Positions by round

Results

Results by matches played

Championship round
Points and goals carried over in full from the regular season.

Positions by round 
Below the positions per round are shown. As teams did not all start with an equal number of points, the initial pre-playoffs positions are also given.

References 

Nigeria Professional Football League seasons
2022–23 in Nigerian football
Nigeria
2023 in African football